August Geiger (September 2, 1887 - 1968) was one of the most prominent American architects in South Florida from 1905 to the late 1940s. He experimented in Mission, Neo-Renaissance and Art Deco architecture, but is most noted for his works in the Mediterranean Revival style.  A number of his works are listed on the U.S. National Register of Historic Places.

Life

Geiger was born in New Haven, Connecticut, the son of Margaretha (Rettenmeyer) Geiger and Louis Geiger, a manufacturer of moldings and other fine woodwork for interior decoration. He was educated at the city's public schools, and completed his studies at Boardman's Manual Training School. Showing a talent for drawing and design, he determined to be an architect and secured a position in a New Haven firm. In 1905, Geiger moved to Miami, where he had vacationed with his family since around 1899, and worked at a local architectural firm for 6 years. The 10th registered architect in Florida, he opened his own firm in 1911, and in 1915 opened a second office in Palm Beach. He worked for Carl Fisher on various construction projects in Miami Beach, and was appointed architect for the Dade County School Board. In 1915 he married Ruth Hinson.

Some of his projects

 Villa Serena (1913) in Coconut Grove, Miami, Florida
 Homestead Public School (also known as Neva Cooper School) (1914), in Homestead, Florida; listed in the National Register
 Southside School (1914), 45 S.W. 13th St., Miami, Florida, NRHP-listed
 Miami City Hospital, Building No. 1, (1915), 1611 NW 12th Ave., Miami, Florida, also called “The Alamo”—and now known as Jackson Memorial Hospital,  (Geiger, August), NRHP-listed, (1916-1918)
 Miami Beach Municipal Golf Course House (1916), in Miami Beach, Florida
 Lincoln Hotel (1916), in Miami Beach, Florida (demolished)
Alton Beach Water Tank, Miami Beach, Florida
 Fort Lauderdale Woman’s Club (1917) in Fort Lauderdale, Florida
 Davie School (1918), 6650 Griffin Rd., Davie, Florida, NRHP-listed
 Hindu Temple (1920) in Miami, Florida
 Fire Station No. 2 (1924), 1401 N. Miami Ave., Miami, Florida (Geiger, August C.), NRHP-listed
 St. Francis Hospital (Miami Beach, Florida) (1924) in Miami Beach, Florida. (demolished)
 Community Theater of Miami Beach (1924) on Lincoln Road, Miami Beach, Florida (demolished)
 Dade County Courthouse (1925) in Miami, Florida; listed in the National Register
 Carl Fisher Residence (1925) in Miami Beach, Florida
 Miami Women's Club (1925) 1737 N. Bayshore Dr., Miami, Florida; NRHP-listed
 First Church of Christ, Scientist (1925) in Miami, Florida
 Coral Way Elementary School (1936) Miami, Florida
 Ida M. Fisher Junior High School (1936), Miami Beach, Florida
 North Beach Elementary School (1936), Miami Beach, Florida
 Chase Federal Bank (1937) Miami Beach, Florida
 Dade County Courthouse, 73 W. Flagler St., Miami, Florida (Geiger, August), NRHP-listed
 Homestead Public School-Neva King Cooper School, 520 N.W. First St., Homestead, Florida (Geiger, August), NRHP-listed
 One or more works in Boca Chita Key Historic District, NW section of Boca Chita Key, roughly bounded by Biscayne Bay and a stone wall Biscayne National Park, Florida (August Geiger Firm), NRHP-listed

See also
 Southside School
 Dade County Courthouse
 First Church of Christ, Scientist
 Coral Way Elementary School
 Spanish Colonial style
 Spanish Colonial Revival Style architecture

References
Notes

Bibliography

 Klepser, Carolyn & Parks, Arva Moore, Miami Then and Now (Then & Now) (Thunder Bay Press; 2002); 
 Barbara Baer Capitman, Deco Delights: Preserving the Beauty and Joy of Miami Beach Architecture (New York: E. P. Dutton, 1988)
 Armbruster; Kleinberg; Florida Architecture and Allied Arts, 1939, 1940, 1941; Curl; Works Progress Administration
 Patricia Gabriel, The Villagers’’ Book of Outstanding Homes of Miami (Coral Gables, Fla.: University of Miami Press, 1975
 Florida Editors Association, The Book of Florida (No place); James O. Jones, 1925

External links
 Old Davie School Historical Museum -- SunSentinel
 Old Davie School Historical Museum
 Dade County landmarks
 Carl Fisher Residence
 Dade County Courthouse
 History of Dade County Courthouse
 Allison Hospital
 Fort Lauderdale Woman's Club
 Villa Serena -- Miami Today

1887 births
1968 deaths
20th-century American architects
Architects from Florida
Mediterranean Revival architects
Art Deco architects
Architects from New Haven, Connecticut
Architects from Miami
History of Miami
History of Miami-Dade County, Florida